The Port of Kołobrzeg  (in Polish generally Port Kołobrzeg) is a Polish seaport in Kołobrzeg, Poland at the Baltic Sea located at the Parsęta river. Port has a yacht harbour, fishing harbour, ferry harbour.

A lighthouse stands on "Fort Ujście"; it was built after the World War II. The old lighthouse was standing ~20 meters closer to sea. When Germans were evacuating from Kołobrzeg, they destroyed the old lighthouse because it was a strategic point for allies.

In 2006, cargo traffic in the seaport equaled 157,600 tons.

In 2006, 18,972 passengers arrived at the port and 18,996 passengers departed in international traffic.

References 

Kolobrzeg
Buildings and structures in Kołobrzeg